The chapters 188–423 of the Bleach manga series, written and illustrated by Tite Kubo, comprise the . The plot follows the Soul Reaper Ichigo Kurosaki who is in charge of slaying Hollows, evil spirits that attack people. He also encounters former Soul Reaper Sosuke Aizen, who created an army of powerful Hollows called Arrancars to destroy the Soul Reapers' organization, Soul Society. In the arc, Ichigo and his allies enter Hueco Mundo to find Orihime.

Bleach was published in individual chapters by Shueisha in Weekly Shonen Jump magazine and was later collected in tankōbon (book) format. In addition to the main series chapters, some chapters are published with a negative chapter number; they are side stories and consist of events that precede the start of the series. The 188th chapter was published on August 8, 2005, while chapter 423 was released on October 11, 2010. The volumes that include the arc are 22 to 48; the former was published on May 2, 2006, and the latter was released on December 3, 2010.

An anime adaptation, produced by Studio Pierrot and TV Tokyo, was broadcast by TV Tokyo. The arc was adapted into episodes from several different seasons intersped with filler episodes and arcs; season 6's episode 110, aired on January 10, 2007, starts the story concluded in season 14's episode 310, broadcast on February 22, 2011.

North American licensor Viz Media serialized the individual chapters in Shonen Jump starting from November 2007 in the United States. Viz Media released the 22nd volume on February 5, 2008, and volume 48 was published on October 2, 2012. A box set containing volumes 22–48 was released on July 7, 2015, along with the Bleach pilot and a poster. The company also re-released the series under the label of "3-in-1 Edition"; the books containing volumes 22 and 48 were released on May 6, 2014 and on August 2, 2016 respectively.

Volumes list

Notes

References

External links
Official Bleach website 
Official Shonen Jump Bleach website

Bleach chapters (188-423)